The Economic and Business Research Center in the Eller College of Management at The University of Arizona, Tucson, is a unit that has been providing the citizens of Arizona with high-quality economic forecasts and applied economic research since 1949. The Economic and Business Research Center's mission is to provide the Arizona community of business and public-sector decision makers with applied research and information on economic, demographic and business trends in Arizona.

Activities 

 Providing the public with economic forecasts, socioeconomic and demographic data, and economic analysis for the state of Arizona and its metro areas via public presentations, publications and their website.
 In addition to providing economic forecasts to the public in general, EBR also provides in-depth economic forecast analysis and databases on a subscription basis to government and business via its economic forecasting unit, The Forecasting Project. This subscription includes access to extensive online databases of important economic, demographic, and quality of life indicators for the State of Arizona, its metro areas and counties.
 Arizona's Economy, quarterly online magazine provides analysis of current economic trends and issues in Arizona.
  Conducting research in the areas of:
 Regional economic, revenue and population forecasting
 Economic impact analysis
 Border and regional development
 Environmental/sustainable economics
 Renewable energy
 Public finance and taxation
 Industry studies
 Responding to data requests and educating the public about data resources and best practices in the use of public data
 EBR's Annual Economic Outlook Luncheon, held each December, provides the Arizona community with a summary analysis of the latest economic forecast for Arizona and the nation. Six months later each June, EBR revisits the forecast in a Mid-Year Economic Outlook Breakfast.
 Arizona Statistical Abstract

Research Studies 

The Economic and Business Research Center conducts applied research and analysis on a wide variety of topics pertaining to economic conditions and trends in Arizona and the Southwest and border region. 
The following are some of the significant studies conducted in the past:

 RTA Economic Impact Study and Revenue vs. Bid/Cost Comparison, Final Report
 Alberta H. Charney, Ph.D. (11pp). December 21, 2009
 Arizona-Sonora Region: Economic Indicators and Regional Initiatives, 2009
 Vera K. Pavlakovich-Kochi, Ph.D., and Jaewon Lim, Ph.D., 2009
 Economic And Revenue Impact of $1 Million in Sustained Cancer Research Funds
 Alberta H. Charney, Ph.D., and Marshall J. Vest., February 2008
 Town of Sahuarita Workforce Assessment Survey
 Maile Nadelhoffer, M.S., M.A., August 2008
 Mexican Visitors to Arizona: Visitor Characteristics and Economic Impacts, 2007–08
 Vera K. Pavlakovich-Kochi, Ph.D. and Alberta H. Charney, Ph.D. (82pp). December 2008
 Astronomy, Planetary and Space Sciences Research in Arizona: An Economic and Tax Revenue Impact Study
 Vera K. Pavlakovich-Kochi, Ph.D., Alberta H. Charney, Ph.D., Lora Mwaniki-Lyman (29pp). October 2007
 A Strategic Assessment of the Economic Benefits of Investments in Research in Arizona
D., Jose Lobo, Ph.D., Maile Nadelhoffer, M.S., M.A. (117pp). April 2007
 The Role of Arizona Cities and Towns in the State's Economy
 Tanis J. Salant, D.P.A.; Alberta H. Charney, Ph.D.; Marshall J. Vest. October 2006.
 The University of Arizona Economic and Tax Revenue Impacts FY 2004
November 2005.

The Forecasting Project 

The Forecasting Project is a community-sponsored research unit within the Economic and Business Research Center producing quarterly economic forecasts for Arizona. These forecasts are recognized as among the most accurate in the Western states.

The following are some of the services provided to sponsoring organizations:

 In-depth economic forecasts and analysis provided on a quarterly basis for Arizona, as well as, the Phoenix-Mesa-Glendale and Tucson metro areas.
 A comprehensive examination of the forecast and business conditions four times a year in roundtable sessions with Eller College economists, other sponsors, and invited speakers.
 Quarterly report containing analysis and tables of forecasted variables, economic indicators, and 35 pages of graphs illustrating recent trends.
 Access to economic forecasting models and supporting data in AREMOS databanks and EXCEL spreadsheets. AREMOS is a product of Global Insight, a national leader in economic consulting and forecasting.
 Long run 30-year forecasts each August.
 Access to The Forecasting Project website for easy downloading of data, reports, and analysis.
 Consulting on issues related to corporate economics and forecasting.

People 
 George Hammond, Ph.D., Director and Eller Research Professor
 Alberta H. Charney, Ph.D., Senior Research Economist* 
 Dan Kinnear, Specialist, Business Research
 Maile Nadelhoffer, Research Economist and Webmaster
 Pia Montoya, Computer Database Specialist
 Jennifer Pullen, Research Economist
 Valorie Rice, Senior Specialist, Business Information
 Vera Pavlakovich-Kochi, Ph.D., Senior Research Scientist

References

External links

Arizona's Economy

University of Arizona
Economy of Arizona